Mirko Beljan (12 October 1899 – 14 October 1959) was an Ustaše officer in the Independent State of Croatia during World War II.

He was born in the village of Dobrići, near Tomislavgrad. On 21 December 1934, he joined the Ustaše in Italy.

Beljan returned to the Balkans in April 1941, following the Axis invasion of Yugoslavia and the creation of the Independent State of Croatia (NDH). In September, he was appointed commander of the Ustaše Sana–Luka headquarters in Banja Luka. During his reign, the Ustaše regularly persecuted local Serbs. They were also particularly anti-Muslim in orientation, and persecuted Bosnian Muslims as well.

Beljan later served as an officer within the personal bodyguard of Croatian leader Ante Pavelić (PTB). In mid-1945, Beljan and other Ustaše retreated to Austria to evade capture by the Yugoslav Partisans. He was captured by Allied forces and spent time in several prisoner-of-war camps. He was released from Allied detention following the end of World War II and emigrated to West Germany. There, he became the president of an organization known as the United Croats of Germany. He died in Munich on 14 October 1959.

Notes

Bibliography

 
 
 

1899 births
1959 deaths
Croatian military personnel of World War II
Ustaša Militia personnel
People from Tomislavgrad